Bow River is a federal electoral district in southern Alberta, Canada, that has been represented in the House of Commons of Canada from 1917 to 1968, from 1979 to 1988 and since 2015.

This riding was first created in 1914 from Macleod riding. It was abolished in 1966 when it was redistributed into Calgary North, Crowfoot, Palliser and Rocky Mountain ridings.

It was re-created in 1976 from parts of Crowfoot, Lethbridge, Palliser and Rocky Mountain ridings. It was abolished in 1987 when it was redistributed into Calgary North, Calgary Northeast, Calgary West, Crowfoot, Lethbridge, Macleod, Red Deer and Wild Rose ridings.

It was re-created by the 2012 federal electoral boundaries redistribution and was legally defined in the 2013 representation order. It came into effect upon the call of the 42nd Canadian federal election, scheduled for October 2015. This newest iteration of the riding was created out of parts of Crowfoot (53%), Medicine Hat (37%) and Macleod (10%) ridings.

Members of Parliament
This riding has elected the following members of the House of Commons of Canada:

Election results

2015–present

1976–1987

1917–1968

See also
 List of Canadian federal electoral districts
 Past Canadian electoral districts

Notes

References

External links
 

Alberta federal electoral districts
Brooks, Alberta
Taber, Alberta